On Monday, April 8, 1957, a widespread tornado outbreak struck the Southeastern United States, particularly the Carolinas, and was responsible for seven deaths and 203 injuries across the region. Most of the activity occurred on either side of the Piedmont, including portions of the Cumberland Plateau. At least 18 tornadoes occurred, including several long-tracked tornado families, one of which included a violent tornado that was retrospectively rated F4 on the Fujita scale. Besides tornadoes, the outbreak also generated other severe weather phenomena such as large hail.

Background

Outbreak statistics

Confirmed tornadoes

Flat Creek–Jefferson–Cheraw–Wallace–McColl, South Carolina/Johns–Maxton–Roseboro–Parkersburg, North Carolina

This was a long-lived tornado family containing at least two separate tornadoes, both of which may have been tornado families themselves. The first member of the tornado family touched down near Flat Creek and moved into the town of Jefferson, tearing apart 23 of 25 buildings on Main Street and destroying or damaging 141 homes and 156 other structures. Near-continuous damage of F2 and F3 intensity extended from Jefferson to near Cheraw and Wallace. The tornado destroyed or damaged 25 homes in Wallace. Parts of a cotton gin were found  distant. 16 injuries occurred in South Carolina, all in Chesterfield County, and losses statewide totaled $750,000 (Grazulis listed damages as $1 million). The second member of the tornado family touched down near McColl and crossed into North Carolina near Johns and east of Maxton. In this area the tornado destroyed several barns, a gas station, and small homes, but was not of violent intensity. The tornado later tracked near St. Pauls en route to Roseboro. The only confirmable F4 damage occurred in a pair of small communities between Roseboro and Parkersburg, where four people died and approximately 20 homes were destroyed. More than 387 homes, businesses, and other structures were damaged or destroyed along the path, including more than 100 in Sampson County alone. In all, 80 people were injured and losses totaled $1 million.

Non-tornadic effects
Additionally,  hail was recorded in Anderson County, South Carolina.

Impact

Aftermath and recovery

See also
List of North American tornadoes and tornado outbreaks
Tornado outbreak of April 1977

Notes

References

Sources
 
 

F4 tornadoes by date
Tornadoes of 1957
Tornadoes in Alabama
Tornadoes in Georgia (U.S. state)
Tornadoes in Mississippi
Tornadoes in North Carolina
Tornadoes in South Carolina
Tornadoes in Tennessee
Tornadoes in Virginia
Tornadoes in Nebraska
Southeastern United States,1957-04-08
Tornado
April 1957 events in the United States